Nicholas Hume-Loftus, 2nd Earl of Ely (11 September 1738 – 12 November 1769) was an Anglo-Irish peer, briefly styled Viscount Loftus in October 1766. 

He represented the constituency of Fethard, County Wexford in the Parliament of Ireland from 1759 to 1766.

He was the subject of a notorious legal case regarding his mental capabilities. Family members testified that he was of normal intelligence, and that any eccentric behaviour should be blamed on his father's ill-treatment of him.

He became Earl of Ely on the death of his father, Nicholas Hume-Loftus, 1st Earl of Ely, in 1766, and assumed his seat in the Irish House of Lords. When he died the earldom became extinct but his other titles were inherited by his uncle.

References

|-

1769 deaths
1738 births
18th-century Anglo-Irish people
Earls in the Peerage of Ireland
Irish MPs 1727–1760
Irish MPs 1761–1768
Nicholas
Members of the Parliament of Ireland (pre-1801) for County Wexford constituencies